Hebbuli is a 2017 Kannada-language action thriller film directed by S. Krishna The film stars Sudeep and V. Ravichandran, who teamed up for the second time after Maanikya (2014). Amala Paul made her debut in Kannada cinema. P. Ravi Shankar, Kabir Duhan Singh and Ravi Kishan (also making his Kannada debut) play the antagonists.

Produced by SRV Productions and Umapathy Films. The cinematography is by A. Karunakar. The soundtrack and film score are composed by Arjun Janya. Principal photography commenced in Bengaluru in mid June 2016, continuing in Hyderabad, Jammu-Kashmir, and Iceland.

The film was released on 23 February 2017 and received positive reviews from critics. The film was a commercial success at the box office.

Plot
Para Commando Captain Ram rescues 3 doctors of their relief camp including Dr. Nandini (who is from Bangalore) from terrorists. Nandini falls in love with him, but does not express it. One night, Ram receives a letter stating that his brother IAS officer Sathyamurthy committed suicide. He arrives at Bangalore and takes the case himself, which had been dismissed as a suicide. He discusses this with his brother-in-law ACP Prathap. Prathap reveals that Sathyamurthy had punished a corporator for an illegal act, but was arrested and suspended for killing the corporator. The next day, he was found dead. He tells him to reopen the case since he feels it to be a murder. He gets a clue from his brother's room that someone hanged his brother and finds the culprit to be of height around 6'2" to 6'3" and left-handed.

Ram also asks Sathyamoorthy's wife, Anuradha where she describes two incidents which reveals that Sathyamoorthy was arrested for the corporator's murder and was suspended. He also felt shattered about his driver's family's suicide (His driver asked him for help for his daughter's operation as she was suffering from cancer. Sathyamurthy arranges the funds to help him, but were found dead). The police interrogated all the goons of the characteristics given by Ram, but one is left. Ram arrives at the place in order to get him arrested, but he escapes with the help of his henchmen and gets hit by a car. Later, a anonymous person named Kabir kills him. In the house, Ram sketches the car driver's picture and his shirt picture. He asks Nandini about him to find him.

Nandini finds him in a gym and reaches his hideout, but Ram reach the hideout on time and chase after the person. They reach a building (which is under construction) where Ram confronts him and divulges the truth, but he doesn't divulge and tells him that they are dangerous and influential people and kills himself by jumping off the building, but Ram takes his mobile phone and after decoding his mobile data with the help of his army personnel, He discovers the real people behind his Sathyamoorthy's death. The culprit is revealed to be Minister Arasikere Anjanappa and Amruth Shah, who is the president of the pharmaceutical association. Arasikere tells him about Ram, where they send Kabir to follow Ram, but Ram eventually captures Kabir and reveals the truth at gunpoint.

Sathyamurthy decided to start generic medicine after he got disturbed by the driver's family's suicide. He discusses it with Arasikere, but Arasikere joins Amruth Shah and Kabir to use the generic medicine for their business profits. Sathyamurthy opposes, due to which Arasikere gets Sathyamurthy arrested on false charges for the corporator's murder and suspended from his job. At night, Sathyamurthy calls him, recording the calls for evidence. Kabir secretly barged into Sathyamurthy's house with his henchman and blackmails him to hand over the documents related to the generic medicine putting Anuradha and his daughter (who are sleeping) at gunpoint, to which Sathyamoorthy adamantly refuses. Kabir finally kills him and stages it as a suicide.

Amruth Shah and Arasikere torture Anuradha and reveals Ram will abandon his mission and hand over the evidence to them. They planned to kill him and kidnap Sathyamoorthy's daughter. Ram hands over Kabir to them, but Arasikere and Amruth Shah kill Kabir for revealing their secrets and thrashes Ram. Arasikere then reveals the whole truth of Sathyamurthy's death, who along with Amruth Shah leave him for dead. However, Ram reveals that he recorded the whole incident with a spy camera hidden on his jacket and broadcast it on respective news channels, to secretly reveal their hidden face to the public and had also saved Sathyamoorthy's daughter with the help of his colleagues. After the revelation, Ram kills them and makes it look like a suicide and reinstate back into the Indian Army.

Cast
 Sudeepa as Captain Ram
 Ravichandran as Sathya Moorthy, an IAS Officer & brother of Ram
 Amala Paul as Dr. Nandini
 Kabir Duhan Singh as Kabir
 P. Ravi Shankar as Arasikere Anjanappa
 Ravi Kishan as Amruth Shah
 Ravi Kale as Chief Officer Murali Menon
 Kalyani as Anuradha Sathya Moorthy (Satya's wife)
 Avinash as ACP Prathap
 Chikkanna as Sundara (Harish in Hindi version)
 Anil Kumar as the suspect
 Sanjeev Sarovar as a school teacher
 Prachi R. Naik as Ritu (Sathya Moorthy's daughter)

Production

Casting
After hiring Sudeepa to play the protagonist, the director cast P. Ravi Shankar to play a negative role opposite Sudeepa. Since the plot required a parallel male lead to play Sudeepa's brother, the director approached V. Ravichandran to play the character. Actress Amala Paul, who was on the lookout for a fresh script in Kannada, was signed to play the female lead. For the other antagonist roles, Kabir Duhan Singh and finally Ravi Kishan were selected.

Costume design
Sudeepa sported a unique hairstyle in the film in which half of his hair was kept short while the other half was grown long and tied back.

Release
The film opened on the occasion of Maha Shivaratri on 23 February 2017 on 400 screens across the country. On 3 January 2019, the film's Tamil version Poiyattam was successful released. The film was also dubbed and released in Hindi in 2018.

Soundtrack

Arjun Janya scored the soundtrack and film score. He composed six songs, including one theme song. The audio was released on 25 December 2016 at Davangere in the presence of the cast and crew. The songs were leaked before Audio Launch. Music label, Zee Music acquired the audio rights making it the firm's first ever Kannada project.

Reception 
Sunayana Suresh of Times of India gave a rating of 4/5 and wrote "If you don't want the typical masala entertainment and are looking for something that moves beyond the staple big hero potboilers then this is for you. Hebbuli cleverly integrates an important issue, while still retaining massy elements. Go watch this one, it will not fail to entertain you".

Rakesh Mehar of The News Minute wrote "At the end of its runtime, Hebbuli is the kind of big-budget film that Sandalwood has learnt to roll out with regularity: with enough spectacle and heroism to please the fans, but falling short of that something extra to draw in the rest of the crowd".

IndiaGlitz.com gave 4/5 rating and wrote "This is a marvelous treat from producer Raghunath and Umapathy. The support of producers for a film with good cause and commercial intersperse is the right mode of film for audience today. This is definitely watchable film for family and fans".

Prakash Upadhyaya of IBTimes India wrote "Hebbuli has a decent storyline. Director S Krishna gets full marks for taking the film to a commercial conclusion with neatly conveyed messages. But the placements of songs and romantic portion between Sudeep and Amala Paul become speed breakers. Nonetheless, Kiccha's electrifying screen presence hides all the shortcomings. Overall, the film is a good entertainer if watched without finding faults like logical loopholes or bad editing".

References

External links
 

2017 films
2010s Kannada-language films
2017 action thriller films
2017 masala films
Films scored by Arjun Janya
Films shot in Iceland
Films shot in Himachal Pradesh
Indian action thriller films
Indian Army in films
Films shot at Ramoji Film City
Films shot in Switzerland
Films directed by S. Krishna